Floorshow is an Australian television series which aired in 1963 on ABC. It was a variety series set in a fictional night-club, hosted by Joe Martin, and also featuring Enzo Toppano and his sextet. Acts included singers, dancers, musicians and such.

Despite having aired in an era where variety series were often wiped, three episodes are held by the National Film and Sound Archive.

See also
The Toppanos

References

External links

Floorshow on IMDb

1963 Australian television series debuts
1963 Australian television series endings
Black-and-white Australian television shows
English-language television shows
Australian variety television shows
Australian Broadcasting Corporation original programming